Tambusamy Krishnan (born 8 July 1944) is a Malaysian sprinter. He competed in the men's 400 metres at the 1972 Summer Olympics.

References

1944 births
Living people
Athletes (track and field) at the 1968 Summer Olympics
Athletes (track and field) at the 1972 Summer Olympics
Malaysian male sprinters
Olympic athletes of Malaysia
Place of birth missing (living people)
Asian Games gold medalists for Malaysia
Asian Games silver medalists for Malaysia
Asian Games bronze medalists for Malaysia
Asian Games medalists in athletics (track and field)
Athletes (track and field) at the 1966 Asian Games
Athletes (track and field) at the 1970 Asian Games
Medalists at the 1966 Asian Games
Medalists at the 1970 Asian Games